The Australian florin was a coin used in the Commonwealth of Australia before decimalisation in 1966.  The florin was worth two shillings (24 pence, or one-tenth of a pound).
The denomination was first minted in 1910 to the same size and weight as the United Kingdom florin.

The coin was minted until 1963, with some years omitted: no florins were minted in 1920, 1929–30, 1937, 1948–50 and 1955. Also, commemorative florins were issued for the following years: 1927, 1934–35, 1951, and 1954. Two different designs were issued in each of the commemorative years (the "regular" approved issue plus the specially approved memorial designs). Also, no coins of any denomination were issued in 1965, as all minting was shut down in preparation for decimalisation. During World War II, between 1942–1944, florin production was supplemented by coinage produced at the San Francisco branch of the United States Mint. These coins bear a small "S" mint mark below the Australian coat of arms.

The image on the reverse of the coin was the coat of arms of Australia (except for commemorative coins). This comes in two forms, all with the kangaroo, emu and the shield containing the coat of arms. Those issued between 1910 and 1936 have a seven-pointed star above the coat of arms, and the Southern Cross constellation within the shield. Those issued between 1938 and 1963, inclusive, have the royal crown above, the six states represented in the shield and a golden wattle plant as a background.  When Australia decimalised officially, on 14 February 1966, the florin was equal to 20 cents.

Circulation types

Commemorative florins

Mintmarks
 H : Birmingham
 M : Melbourne
 S : San Francisco

References
 
 
 Florins article on Cruzis Coins

External links

 Online Coin Club / Coins from Australia / Coin Type: Florin
 Florin | Blue Sheet
 Australian Florins

Currencies introduced in 1910
Coins of Australia
1910 establishments in Australia
1963 disestablishments in Australia